Aaron Danks (born 15 June 1983) is an English football coach who is currently a first team coach at EFL Championship club Middlesbrough. 

Danks was assistant manager to Vincent Kompany at Anderlecht, before leaving to be assistant to Dean Smith and Steven Gerrard at Aston Villa. He has also coached at Birmingham City, West Bromwich Albion and England U21.

Career

Youth coaching
Danks' first role in football was as a Community Football Development Officer at Birmingham City, joining in 1999 and later coaching in their academy. In 2005, Danks was hired as a youth coach at the West Bromwich Albion Academy, working for the club for over a decade between 2005 and 2016, before leaving after being selected by The Football Association to become Head of Specialist Coaching and Lead Offensive Specialist Coach for various levels of the England national team. Danks was part of the coaching staff for the England U20 team that won the 2017 FIFA U-20 World Cup. 

As part of his work with the FA, Danks spent a short time with basketball team Golden State Warriors, working closely with Stephen Curry and his individual development coach. 

In 2019, Danks attained a UEFA Pro Licence, graduating alongside the likes of Steven Gerrard and Peter Schmeichel.

Danks worked as assistant manager for the England U21 side for one year from 2020 to 2021.

Senior coaching

Anderlecht 
On 1 July 2021, Danks was appointed assistant manager to Vincent Kompany at Belgian First Division A club R.S.C. Anderlecht.

Aston Villa 
On 1 September 2021, Danks departed Anderlecht to join Premier League club Aston Villa, as assistant to Dean Smith, following the departure of Richard O'Kelly. On 13 November 2021, following the sacking of Dean Smith and the appointment of Steven Gerrard as Aston Villa manager it was confirmed that Danks would retain his position as assistant manager.

On 21 October 2022, the day after the sacking of Gerrard as Villa manager, it was announced that Danks would remain at Villa and act as caretaker manager for their upcoming Premier League match against Brentford, which Villa won 4–0. On 24 October, Aston Villa announced that Unai Emery would take over as manager, however, due to work permit formalities - Danks would remain as interim manager until 1 November.  On 31 October, it was confirmed that Danks had been offered another coaching role at Aston Villa, away from the first team.

Middlesbrough 
On 1 December 2022, Danks departed Aston Villa and joined Michael Carrick's backroom staff at Middlesbrough as a first team coach.

Managerial statistics

References 

1985 births
Middlesbrough F.C. non-playing staff
Aston Villa F.C. non-playing staff
R.S.C. Anderlecht non-playing staff
West Bromwich Albion F.C. non-playing staff
Living people
People from Birmingham, West Midlands
English football managers
Aston Villa F.C. managers
Association football coaches
English expatriate sportspeople in Belgium
Birmingham City F.C. non-playing staff
English expatriate sportspeople in the United States
Premier League managers
Golden State Warriors coaches